Bonar Stewart Bain (February 4, 1923 – February 18, 2005) was a Canadian actor and the identical twin brother of actor Conrad Bain.

Life and career
Bain once played a fictional "evil" twin to Conrad ("Hank Bain") in an episode of SCTV, as well as appearing on two of his brother's television series: as Arthur Harmon (Conrad Bain)'s twin brother, the libidinous, larcenous Arnold, on Maude, and, in drag, as Anna Van Drummond, on Diff'rent Strokes.

Death
He died of cancer in Edmonton, Alberta on February 18, 2005, at the age of 82. He was survived by his wife Vella, who died in January 2011, at the age of 85.

In popular culture
Bain figures in the lyrics to "Bober," a song from the Mike Keneally Band's 2004 album Dog. Keneally sings that his dog, Bober, was "half-named after Conrad Bain's brother."

Filmography
 Draw! as Poker Player (1984)
 Diff'rent Strokes as Anna Van Drummond (1983)
 Running Brave as University Professor  (1983) 
 SCTV Network as Hank Bain (in "Zontar") (1981)
 Powder Heads as Dispatcher (1980) 
 Maude as Arnold Harmon (in "Vivian's Surprise") (1977)

References

External links

1923 births
2005 deaths
20th-century Canadian male actors
Canadian male television actors
Deaths from cancer in Alberta
Identical twin male actors
Male actors from Alberta
People from Lethbridge
Canadian twins